On the Sensations of Tone as a Physiological Basis for the Theory of Music (German ), commonly referred to as Sensations of Tone, is a foundational work on music acoustics and the perception of sound by Hermann von Helmholtz.

The first German edition was published in 1863. The English translation by Alexander J. Ellis was first published in 1875 (the first English edition was from the 1870 third German edition; the second English edition from the 1877 fourth German edition was published in 1885; the 1895 and 1912 third and fourth English editions were reprints of the second edition). The editions translated into English contain detailed commentary and notes (titled "Additions by the Translator") by Ellis.

Helmholtz declared that he started working on his book in 1854, which concluded in 1862.

Helmholtz started publishing on acoustics in 1852. His last article on acoustics was in 1878, reviewing the book by Lord Rayleigh (Theory of Sound). Therefore, Helmholtz published articles/books and gave lectures on acoustics for at least 24 years.

The book's introduction, Dover edition from 1954, by the German physicist Henry Margenau, with a list of selected publications by Helmholtz, is available here.

Author's prefaces from three German editions (translated)

Preface to the first German edition (1862) 
In laying before the Public the result of eight years' labour, I must first pay a debt of gratitude. The following investigations could not have been accomplished without the construction of new instruments, which did not enter into the inventory of a Physiological Institute, and which far exceeded In cost the usual resources of a German philosopher. The means for obtaining them have come to me from unusual sources. The apparatus for the artificial construction of vowels, described on pp. 121 to 126, I owe to the munificence of his Majesty King Maximilian of Bavaria, to whom German science is indebted, on so many of its fields, for ever-ready sympathy and assistance. For the construction of my Harmonium in perfectly natural intonation, described on p. 316, I was able to use the Soemmering prize which had been awarded me by the Senckenberg Physical Society (die Senckenbergische naturforschende Gesellschaft) at Frankfurt-on-the-Main. While publicly repeating the expression of my gratitude for this assistance in my investigations, I hope that the investigations themselves as set forth in this book will prove far better than mere words how earnestly I have endeavoured to make a worthy use of the means thus placed at my command.

H. Helmholtz.
Heidelberg: October 1862.

Preface to the third German edition (1870) 
The present Third Edition has been much more altered in some parts than the second. Thus in the sixth chapter I have been able to make use of the new physiological and anatomical research on the ear. This has led to a modification of my view of the action of Corti's arches. Again, it, appears that the peculiar articulation between the auditory ossicles called 'hammer' and 'anvil' might easily cause within the ear itself the formation of harmonic upper partial tones for simple tones which are sounded loudly. By this means that peculiar series of upper partial tones, on the existence of which the present theory of music is essentially founded, receives a new subjective value, entirely independent of external alterations in the quality of tone. To illustrate the anatomical descriptions, I have been able to add a series of new woodcuts, principally from Henle's Manual of Anatomy, with the author's permission, for which I here take the opportunity of publicly thanking him. I have made many changes in re-editing the section on the History of Music, and hope that I have improved its connection. I must, however, request the reader to regard this section as a mere compilation from secondary sources; I have neither time nor preliminary knowledge sufficient for original studies in this extremely difficult field. The older history of music to the commencement of Discant, is scarcely more than a confused heap of secondary subjects, while we can only make hypotheses concerning the principal matters in question. Of course, however, every theory of music must endeavour to bring some order into this chaos, and it cannot be denied that it contains many important facts.

For the representation of pitch in just or natural intonation, I have abandoned the method originally proposed by Hauptmann, which was not sufficiently clear in involved cases, and have adopted the system of Herr A. von Oettingen [p. 276], as had already been done in M. G. Guéroult's French translation of this book. [A comparison of the Third with the Second editions, shewing the changes and additions individually, is here omitted.]

If I may be allowed in conclusion to add a few words on the reception experienced by the Theory of Music here propounded, I should say that published objections almost exclusively relate to my Theory of Consonance, as if this were the pith of the matter. Those who prefer mechanical explanations express their regret at my having left any room in this field for the action of artistic invention and esthetic inclination, and they have endeavoured to complete my system by new numerical speculations. Other critics with more metaphysical proclivities have rejected my Theory of Consonance, and with it, as they imagine, my whole Theory of Music, as too coarsely mechanical.

I hope my critics will excuse me if I conclude from the opposite nature of their objections, that I have struck out nearly the right path. As to my Theory of Consonance, I must claim it to be a mere systematisation of observed facts (with the exception of the functions of the cochlea of the ear, which is moreover an hypothesis that may be entirely dispensed with). But I consider it a mistake to make the Theory of Consonance the essential foundation of the Theory of Music, and I had thought that this opinion was clearly enough expressed in my book. The essential basis of Music is Melody. Harmony has become to Western Europeans during the last three centuries an essential, and, to our present taste, indispensable means of strengthening melodic relations, but finely developed music existed for thousands of years and still exists in ultra-European nations, without any harmony at all. And to my metaphysico-esthetical opponents I must reply, that I cannot think I have undervalued the artistic emotions of the human mind in the Theory of Melodic Construction, by endeavouring to establish the physiological facts on which esthetic feeling is based. But to those who think I have not gone far enough in my physical explanations, I answer, that in the first place a natural philosopher is never bound to construct systems about everything he knows and does not know; and secondly, that I should consider a theory which claimed to have shewn that all the laws of modern Thorough Bass were natural necessities, to stand condemned as having proved too much.

Musicians have found most fault with the manner in which I have characterised the Minor Mode. I must refer in reply to those very accessible documents, the musical compositions of A.D. 1500 to A.D. 1750, during which the modern Minor was developed. These will shew how slow and fluctuating was its development, and that the last traces of its incomplete tate are still visible in the works of Sebastian Bach and Handel.

Heidelberg: May 1870.

Preface to the fourth German edition (1877) 
IN the essential conceptions of musical relations I have found nothing to alter in this new edition. In this respect I can but maintain what I have stated in the chapters containing them and in my preface to the third [German] edition. In details, however, much has been remodelled, and in some parts enlarged. As a guide for readers of former editions, I take the liberty to enumerate the following places containing additions and alterations.

[omitted]

H. Helmholtz.
Berlin : April 1877.

Translator's notice to the second English edition, 1885 
In preparing a new edition of this translation of Professor Helmholtz's great work on the Sensations of Tone, which was originally made from the third German edition of 1870, and was finished in June 1875, my first care was to make it exactly conform to the fourth German edition of 1877 (the last which has appeared). The numerous alterations made in the fourth edition are specified in the Author's preface. In order that no merely verbal changes might escape me, every sentence of my translation was carefully re-read with the German. This has enabled me to correct several misprints and mistranslations which had escaped my previous very careful revision, and I have taken the opportunity of improving the language in many places. Scarcely a page has escaped such changes.

Professor Helmholtz's book having taken its place as a work which all candidates for musical degrees are expected to study, my next care was by supplementary notes or brief insertions, always carefully distinguished from the Author's by being inclosed in [], to explain any difficulties which the student might feel, and to shew him how to acquire an insight into the Author's theories, which were quite strange to musicians when they appeared in the first German edition of 1863, but in the twenty-two years which have since elapsed have been received as essentially valid by those competent to pass judgment.

For this purpose I have contrived the Harmonical, explained on pp. 466–469, by which, as shewn in numerous footnotes, almost every point of theory can be illustrated; and I have arranged for its being readily procurable at a moderate charge. It need scarcely be said that my interest in this instrument is purely scientific. My own Appendix has been entirely rewritten, much has been rejected and the rest condensed, but, as may be seen in the Contents, I have added a considerable amount of information about points hitherto little known, such as the Determination and History of Musical Pitch, Non-Harmonic scales, Tuning, and in especial I have given an account of the work recently done on Beats and Combinational Tones, and on Vowel Analysis and Synthesis, mostly since the fourth German edition appeared. Finally, I wish gratefully to acknowledge the assistance, sometimes very great, which I have received from Messrs. D. J. Blaikley, R. H. M.Bosanquet, Colin Brown, A. Cavaillé-Coll, A. J. Hipkins, W. Huggins, F.R.S., Shuji Isawa, H. Ward Poole, R. S. Rockstro, Hermann Smith, Steinway, Augustus Stroh, and James Paul White, as will be seen by referring to their names in the Index.

Alexander J. Ellis.

25 Argyll Road, Kensington: July 1885.

References

External links
Free downloadable versions of the German-language editions, in several different formats.
 
 
 

Free downloadable versions of the English translation by Alexander J. Ellis, in several different formats.
 
 
 
 

Music books
Hermann von Helmholtz